Gordon railway station served the village of Gordon, Scottish Borders, Scotland from 1863 to 1948 on the Berwickshire Railway.

History 
The station opened on 16 November 1863 on the North British Railway. It closed to both passengers and goods traffic on 13 August 1948.

References

External links 

Disused railway stations in the Scottish Borders
Former North British Railway stations
Railway stations in Great Britain opened in 1863
Railway stations in Great Britain closed in 1948
1863 establishments in Scotland
1948 disestablishments in Scotland